The Nokia 6020 and 6021 are feature phones made by Nokia, running the Series 40 platform. The Nokia 6020 has a camera and no Bluetooth support, while the Nokia 6021 has Bluetooth and does not have a camera. The Nokia 6020 was introduced in November 2004 as a successor of the Nokia 6010 for Americas and the Nokia 3510i and also the Nokia 6230 for the global market. It was succeeded by the Nokia 6070 in 2006.

Features 

 Keymat with 5-way navigation key
 Captures with the VGA camera and video recorder
 0.3 megapixel camera which has four modes: Standard, Portrait, Night, and Video
 3.5 megabytes internal memory
 To transfer data such as photo images, videos and audio clips to a PC it needs a Pop-Port USB Data Cable or the Nokia Connectivity Adapter Cable
 Records up to 50-seconds video clip with sound
 65,536 colours TFT LCD display
 Record up to 5-minute voice recorder
 Push To Talk
 Synchronise data with PC via Nokia PC Suite or remotely with SyncML
 Internet browsing with an XHTML-capable browser, via EDGE and GPRS
 Keeping track of personal finances with Mobile Wallet
 Has infrared to send or receive data to or from other compatible devices like PCs and other phone devices with Infrared connectivity supported
 Supports MP3 ringtones (requires firmware version 4.50 or higher)

Connectivity 

 2G Network
 GSM 900/1800/1900 MHz 
 GSM 850/1800/1900 MHz US version (602xb)

References

External links 

 Nokia 6020 Phone Support

6020
Mobile phones introduced in 2004
Mobile phones with infrared transmitter